Jaime Monzó Cots (also spelled Jaume, 31 October 1946 – 7 January 2020) was a Spanish swimmer who won a silver medal in the 200 m backstroke at the 1966 European Aquatics Championships. He competed in the same event at the 1968 Summer Olympics, but did not reach the finals.

Notes

References

External links 
 
 
 
 

1946 births
2020 deaths
Spanish male backstroke swimmers
Olympic swimmers of Spain
Swimmers at the 1968 Summer Olympics
European Aquatics Championships medalists in swimming
Mediterranean Games medalists in swimming
Mediterranean Games bronze medalists for Spain
Swimmers at the 1967 Mediterranean Games
Swimmers from Catalonia